The Supply-class fast combat support ships are a class of four United States Navy supply ships used to refuel, rearm, and restock ships in the United States Navy in both the Atlantic and Pacific Oceans.

These are the only US Navy resupply ships able to keep up with the strike groups, but due to their cost to operate the Navy intends to retire them starting in 2014. The Supply-class ships are built to military combatant standards and are shock hardened.

Ships

General characteristics
 Displacement：19,700 tons (empty), 49,000 tons (full) 
 Length： (overall)
 Beam： (extreme beam)
 Draft: 
 Export power：78.33MW 
 Maximum speed：25 knots 
 Range 6,000 nm 
 Complement 40 officers + 667 enlisted (USN), 176 civilians, 30-45 military (MSC)
 Propulsion：4 x General Electric LM2500
Cargo capacity
 Diesel Fuel Marine (DFM): 
 JP-5 fuel: 
 Bottled gas: 800 bottles
 Ordnance stowage: 
 Chill and freeze stowage: 
 Water:

Notes

References
 Official MSC Class Factsheet
 Supply class at Naval-technology.com

 

Auxiliary replenishment ship classes
 
Auxiliary transport ship classes